La Morenita is a conspicuous rocky hill rising to 93 m in the southwest extremity of Half Moon Island in the South Shetland Islands, Antarctica. It surmounts the Argentine Antarctic base Cámara situated in its northern foothills, Menguante Cove to the northeast and Mugla Passage to the south. The area was visited by early 19th century sealers operating from nearby Yankee Harbour.

The feature's name is descriptive (Spanish for ‘the brown one’) from the colour of the local volcanic rocks, and appeared in a 2000 publication following Argentine ornithological research on the island, and in the 2005 and 2009 Bulgarian maps of Livingston Island.

Location

Maps
 L.L. Ivanov et al. Antarctica: Livingston Island and Greenwich Island, South Shetland Islands. Scale 1:100000 topographic map. Sofia: Antarctic Place-names Commission of Bulgaria, 2005.
 L.L. Ivanov. Antarctica: Livingston Island and Greenwich, Robert, Snow and Smith Islands. Scale 1:120000 topographic map.  Troyan: Manfred Wörner Foundation, 2009.  
 Antarctic Digital Database (ADD). Scale 1:250000 topographic map of Antarctica. Scientific Committee on Antarctic Research (SCAR). Since 1993, regularly updated.
 L.L. Ivanov. Antarctica: Livingston Island and Smith Island. Scale 1:100000 topographic map. Manfred Wörner Foundation, 2017.

References
 Cesar Garcia Esponda, Nestor Coria & Diego Montalti. Breeding birds at Half Moon Island, South Shetland Islands, Antarctica, 1995/96. Marine Ornithology, 2000, 28, pp. 59–62.

Hills of the South Shetland Islands